Brigadier Mohammad Jamhour (Retired) is a Jordanian brigadier. He was born in Jerusalem on September 25, 1930.  Jamhour graduated from Bishop Gobat School which was located on Mount Zion just outside the Walls of Old Jerusalem near  King David Gate, and it was the first English Missionary School established during the Ottoman Empire in 1873. In 1950 Jamhour was selected to study in the United Kingdom as an officer cadet at Eaton Hall, Mons Officer Cadet School. In 1951 he was accepted at the Royal Military Academy Sandhurst. In 1952 King Hussein graduated from Harrow School and became an Officer Cadet in the same college at Sandhurst.  Jamhour became a close friend to the king and they graduated together in 1953.

After graduation, Jamhour went to the British Army's Royal School of Artillery on Salisbury Plain. When he completed his military studies, he returned to Jordan to serve his country as an officer in the Armed Forces and he attended many advanced military courses in England and Germany. In 1964, he graduated from the United States Army Command and General Staff College at Fort Leavenworth Kansas USA. He holds a master's degree in Military Science.

In 1970 he became the youngest Brigadier in the Army and was appointed as the Commandant of the Military School becoming Director of Training at the General Headquarters and lecturer of military science at the University of Jordan.

In 1974 he was retired at the age of 44 and was appointed as General Manager of the Royal Society for the Conservation of Nature playing a successful role in establishing the Shaumari Wildlife Reserve near Azrak Oasis for the Arabian oryx, ostriches, and gazelles with the cooperation of the World Wild Life Fund, Switzerland and San Diego Zoo in California.

He wrote frequently about current affairs in the Middle East and translated several military books such as: Military Leadership, Surface to Surface Artillery, Staff Duties in the Field, Handling Units in the Field, Map Reading, Military Dictionary and many other tactical and technical pamphlets.

In 1985, he was appointed to the Jordan TV, department of censorship and evaluation of English programs a post he held until 2000.

References 
 The Hashemite Homeland and Its Men, Housam Asfour, Jordan national Library Registration number: 2053/8/2005

1930 births
Living people
Jordanian military personnel
Graduates of the Mons Officer Cadet School
Graduates of the Royal Military Academy Sandhurst
Non-U.S. alumni of the Command and General Staff College